MTV e2 was a Canadian entertainment news program that aired on MTV and A; hosted by Anna Cyzon; produced at the Masonic Temple in downtown Toronto.

The show was discontinued on July 16, 2008.

External links
 Official MTV e2 website

Entertainment news shows in Canada
CTV 2 original programming
2008 Canadian television series endings
2000s Canadian television news shows